Vincent J. Lozzi is an American politician who served in the Massachusetts House of Representatives.

Early life
Lozzi was born on January 28, 1932, in Everett, Massachusetts. He attended public schools in Everett and graduated from Merrimack College's School of Industrial Relations in 1962.

Political career
Lozzi was a member of the Lynn City Council from 1975 to 1981. From 1981 to 1983, he was a Lynn Housing Commissioner. He returned to the City Council in 1983 and remained there until 1985.

From 1985 to 1991, Lozzi represented the 10th Essex District in the Massachusetts House of Representatives. He lost to Jeffery Hayward in the 1990 Democratic primary.

Later life
Lozzi currently resides in New Hampshire. His son, Wayne Lozzi, is a City Councilor in Lynn.

References

1932 births
Democratic Party members of the Massachusetts House of Representatives
Politicians from Everett, Massachusetts
Lynn, Massachusetts City Council members
Merrimack College alumni
Living people